The 14th Satellite Awards is an award ceremony honoring the year's outstanding performers, films, television shows, home videos and interactive media, presented by the International Press Academy at the InterContinental Hotel in Los Angeles.

The nominations were announced on November 30, 2009. The winners were announced on December 20, 2009.

Special achievement awards
Auteur Award (for his trademark style of imaginative special effects and plots) – Roger Corman

Mary Pickford Award (for outstanding contribution to the entertainment industry) – Michael York

Nikola Tesla Award (for his creative cinematography in films) – Roger Deakins

Outstanding Guest Star – Kristin Chenoweth (Glee)

Outstanding New Talent – Gabourey Sidibe (Precious)

Motion picture winners and nominees

Best Actor – Drama
Jeremy Renner for The Hurt Locker
 Jeff Bridges for Crazy Heart
 Hugh Dancy for Adam
 Johnny Depp for Public Enemies
 Colin Firth for A Single Man
 Michael Sheen for The Damned United

Best Actor – Musical or Comedy
Michael Stuhlbarg for A Serious Man
 George Clooney for Up in the Air
 Bradley Cooper for The Hangover
 Matt Damon for The Informant!
 Daniel Day-Lewis for Nine

Best Actress – Drama
Shohreh Aghdashloo for The Stoning of Soraya M.
 Emily Blunt for The Young Victoria
 Abbie Cornish for Bright Star
 Penélope Cruz for Broken Embraces
 Carey Mulligan for An Education
 Catalina Saavedra for The Maid

Best Actress – Musical or Comedy
Meryl Streep for Julie & Julia
 Sandra Bullock for The Proposal
 Marion Cotillard for Nine
 Zooey Deschanel for (500) Days of Summer
 Katherine Heigl for The Ugly Truth

Best Animated or Mixed Media Film
Fantastic Mr. Fox
 Cloudy with a Chance of Meatballs
 Harry Potter and the Half-Blood Prince
 The Princess and the Frog
 Up
 Where the Wild Things Are

Best Art Direction and Production Design
A Single Man
 2012
 The Imaginarium of Doctor Parnassus
 Public Enemies
 Red Cliff
 The Road

Best Cinematography
Dion Beebe for Nine
 Roger Deakins for A Serious Man
 Zhang Li and Lü Yue for Red Cliff
 Guillermo Navarro and Erich Roland for It Might Get Loud
 Robert Richardson for Inglourious Basterds
 Dante Spinotti for Public Enemies

Best Costume Design
Monique Prudhomme for The Imaginarium of Doctor Parnassus
 Colleen Atwood for Nine
 Consolata Boyle for Chéri
 Sandy Powell for The Young Victoria
 Tim Yip for Red Cliff

Best Director
Kathryn Bigelow for The Hurt Locker
 Neill Blomkamp for District 9
 Jane Campion for Bright Star
 Lee Daniels for Precious
 Rob Marshall for Nine
 Lone Scherfig for An Education

Best Documentary Film
Every Little Step
 The Beaches of Agnès
 The Cove
 It Might Get Loud
 The September Issue
 Valentino: The Last Emperor

Best Editing
Chris Innis and Bob Murawski for The Hurt Locker
 David Brenner for 2012
 Julian Clarke for District 9
 Robert A. Ferretti, Yang Hongyu, Angie Lam, and David Wu for Red Cliff
 Greg Finton for It Might Get Loud
 Claire Simpson and Wyatt Smith for Nine

Best Film – Drama
The Hurt Locker
 Bright Star
 An Education
 The Messenger
 Precious
 The Stoning of Soraya M. (Sangsâr Sorayâ M.)

Best Film – Musical or Comedy
Nine
 The Informant!
 It's Complicated
 Julie & Julia
 A Serious Man
 Up in the Air

Best Foreign Language Film
Broken Embraces (Los abrazos rotos) • Spain (TIE) The Maid (La Nana) • Chile (TIE) I Killed My Mother (J'ai tué ma mère) • Canada
 Red Cliff (Chi bi) • China
 The White Ribbon (Das weiße Band) • Germany
 Winter in Wartime (Oorlogswinter) • Netherlands

Best Original ScoreUp in the Air – Rolfe Kent Amelia – Gabriel Yared
 The Informant! – Marvin Hamlisch
 Public Enemies – Elliot Goldenthal
 Up – Michael Giacchino
 Where the Wild Things Are – Carter Burwell and Karen O

Best Original Song"The Weary Kind" by Ryan Bingham and T Bone Burnett from Crazy Heart
 "Almost There" by Randy Newman from The Princess and the Frog
 "Cinema Italiano" by Maury Yeston from Nine
 "Down in New Orleans" by Randy Newman from The Princess and the Frog
 "I Can See in Color" by Mary J. Blige from Precious
 "We Are the Children of the World" by Terry Gilliam from The Imaginarium of Doctor Parnassus

Best Screenplay – Adapted
Geoffrey Fletcher for Precious
 Neill Blomkamp and Terri Tatchell for District 9
 Nora Ephron for Julie & Julia
 Nick Hornby for An Education
 Jason Reitman and Sheldon Turner for Up in the Air

Best Screenplay – Original
Scott Neustadter and Michael H. Weber for (500) Days of Summer
 Mark Boal for The Hurt Locker
 Jane Campion for Bright Star
 Joel Coen and Ethan Coen for A Serious Man
 Pete Docter and Bob Peterson for Up

Best Sound
2012
 It Might Get Loud
 Nine
 Red Cliff
 Terminator Salvation
 Transformers: Revenge of the Fallen

Best Supporting Actor
Christoph Waltz for Inglourious Basterds
 Woody Harrelson for The Messenger
 James McAvoy for The Last Station
 Alfred Molina for An Education
 Timothy Spall for The Damned United

Best Supporting Actress
Mo'Nique for Precious
 Emily Blunt for Sunshine Cleaning
 Penélope Cruz for Nine
 Anna Kendrick for Up in the Air
 Mozhan Marnò for The Stoning of Soraya M.

Best Visual Effects
2012
 District 9
 Fantastic Mr. Fox
 The Imaginarium of Doctor Parnassus
 Red Cliff
 Transformers: Revenge of the Fallen

Outstanding Motion Picture Ensemble
Nine

Television winners and nominees

Best Actor – Drama Series
Bryan Cranston – Breaking Bad
 Gabriel Byrne – In Treatment
 Nathan Fillion – Castle
 Jon Hamm – Mad Men
 Lucian Msamati – The No. 1 Ladies' Detective Agency
 Bill Paxton – Big Love

Best Actor – Musical or Comedy Series
Matthew Morrison – Glee
 Alec Baldwin – 30 Rock
 Jemaine Clement – Flight of the Conchords
 Stephen Colbert – The Colbert Report
 Danny McBride – Eastbound & Down
 Jim Parsons – The Big Bang Theory

Best Actor – Miniseries or Television Film
Brendan Gleeson – Into the Storm
 Kevin Bacon – Taking Chance
 Kenneth Branagh – Wallander
 William Hurt – Endgame
 Jeremy Irons – Georgia O'Keeffe
 Ian McKellen – The Prisoner

Best Actress – Drama Series
Glenn Close – Damages
 Stana Katic – Castle
 Julianna Margulies – The Good Wife
 Elisabeth Moss – Mad Men
 Jill Scott – The No. 1 Ladies' Detective Agency

Best Actress – Musical or Comedy Series
Lea Michele – Glee
 Julie Bowen – Modern Family
 Toni Collette – United States of Tara
 Brooke Elliott – Drop Dead Diva
 Edie Falco – Nurse Jackie
 Tina Fey – 30 Rock
 Mary-Louise Parker – Weeds

Best Actress – Miniseries or Television Film
Drew Barrymore – Grey Gardens
 Lauren Ambrose – Loving Leah
 Judy Davis – Diamonds
 Jessica Lange – Grey Gardens
 Janet McTeer – Into the Storm
 Sigourney Weaver – Prayers for Bobby

Best Miniseries
Little Dorrit
 Collision
 Diamonds
 The Prisoner
 Wallander

Best Series – Drama
Breaking Bad
 Big Love
 Damages
 The Good Wife
 In Treatment
 Mad Men

Best Series – Musical or Comedy
Glee
 30 Rock
 The Big Bang Theory
 Flight of the Conchords
 How I Met Your Mother
 Weeds

Best Supporting Actor – Series, Miniseries, or Television Film
John Lithgow – Dexter
 Chris Colfer – Glee
 Tom Courtenay – Little Dorrit
 Neil Patrick Harris – How I Met Your Mother
 John Noble – Fringe
 Harry Dean Stanton – Big Love

Best Supporting Actress – Series, Miniseries, or Television Film
Jane Lynch – Glee
 Cherry Jones – 24
 Judy Parfitt – Little Dorrit
 Anika Noni Rose – The No. 1 Ladies' Detective Agency
 Chloë Sevigny – Big Love
 Vanessa Williams – Ugly Betty

Best Television Film
Grey Gardens
 The Courageous Heart of Irena Sendler
 Endgame
 Into the Storm
 Loving Leah
 Taking Chance

Outstanding Television Ensemble
True Blood

New Media winners and nominees

Best Classic DVD
North by Northwest (50th Anniversary Edition)
 Gone with the Wind (Two-Disc 70th Anniversary Edition)
 Paul Newman – The Tribute Collection (Butch Cassidy and the Sundance Kid, Exodus, From the Terrace, Hemingway's Adventures of a Young Man, The Hustler, The Long, Hot Summer, Rally Round the Flag, Boys!, The Towering Inferno, The Verdict, and What a Way to Go!)
 To Catch a Thief (The Centennial Collection)
 The Wizard of Oz (Two-Disc 70th Anniversary Edition)
 Yentl (Two-Disc Director's Extended Edition)

Best Documentary DVD
Every Little Step
 Days That Shook the World (The Complete Second Season)
 Food, Inc.
 Moving Midway
 Religulous
 Woodstock: 3 Days of Peace & Music – The Director's Cut (Two-Disc 40th Anniversary Edition)

Best DVD Extras
Yentl (Two-Disc Director's Extended Edition)
 Across the Universe
 The Big Lebowski (10th Anniversary Edition)
 Dexter (The Complete Third Season)
 Hogan's Heroes (The Komplete Series – Kommandant's Kollection)
 Primal Fear (Hard Evidence Edition)
 Up (Two-Disc Deluxe Edition)

Best DVD Release of a TV Show
True Blood (The Complete First Season)
 Ally McBeal (The Complete Series)
 Dollhouse (Season 1)
 Hogan's Heroes (The Komplete Series – Kommandant's Kollection)
 Project Runway (Season 5)
 Sons of Anarchy (Season One)

Best Overall Blu-Ray
Star Trek (3-Disc Digital Copy Special Edition)
 Rocky: The Undisputed Collection (Rocky, Rocky II, Rocky III, Rocky IV, Rocky V, and Rocky Balboa)
 Say Anything... (20th Anniversary Edition)
 South Pacific (50th Anniversary Edition)
 Up (4-Disc Combo Pack)
 The Wizard of Oz (70th Anniversary Ultimate Collector's Edition)

Best Overall DVD
Gone with the Wind (Two-Disc 70th Anniversary Edition)
 An American Werewolf in London (Special Edition)
 The Reader
 Slumdog Millionaire
 Up (Two-Disc Deluxe Edition)
 The Wizard of Oz (70th Anniversary Ultimate Collector's Edition)

Best Youth DVD
The Wizard of Oz (Two-Disc 70th Anniversary Edition)
 Bolt (Deluxe DVD Edition)
 Ice Age: Dawn of the Dinosaurs (Double DVD Pack)
 Peanuts: 1960's Collection (A Charlie Brown Christmas, Charlie Brown's All Stars!, He's Your Dog, Charlie Brown, It's the Great Pumpkin, Charlie Brown, It Was a Short Summer, Charlie Brown, and You're in Love, Charlie Brown)
 Sesame Street (40 Years of Sunny Days)
 Up (Two-Disc Deluxe Edition)

Awards breakdown

Film
Winners:
4 / 5 The Hurt Locker: Best Actor – Drama / Best Director / Best Editing / Best Film – Drama
3 / 11 Nine: Best Cinematography / Best Film – Musical or Comedy / Outstanding Motion Picture Ensemble
2 / 4 2012: Best Sound / Best Visual Effects
2 / 5 Precious: Best Screenplay – Adapted / Best Supporting Actress
1 / 1 Every Little Step: Best Documentary Film
1 / 2 (500) Days of Summer: Best Screenplay – Original
1 / 2 Broken Embraces: Best Foreign Language Film
1 / 2 Crazy Heart: Best Original Song
1 / 2 Fantastic Mr. Fox: Best Animated or Mixed Media Film
1 / 2 Inglourious Basterds: Best Supporting Actor
1 / 3 Julie & Julia: Best Actress – Musical or Comedy
1 / 3 A Single Man: Best Art Direction and Production Design
1 / 3 The Stoning of Soraya M.: Best Actress – Drama
1 / 4 The Imaginarium of Doctor Parnassus: Best Costume Design
1 / 4 A Serious Man: Best Actor – Musical or Comedy
1 / 5 Up in the Air: Best Original Score

Losers:
0 / 6 Red Cliff
0 / 5 An Education
0 / 4 Bright Star, District 9, It Might Get Loud, Public Enemies
0 / 3 The Informant!, The Princess and the Frog, Up
0 / 2 The Damned United, The Maid, The Messenger, Transformers: Revenge of the Fallen, The Young Victoria, Where the Wild Things Are

Television
Winners:
4 / 5 Glee: Best Actor & Actress – Musical or Comedy Series / Best Series – Musical or Comedy / Best Supporting Actress – Series, Miniseries, or Television Film
2 / 2 Breaking Bad: Best Actor – Drama Series / Best Series – Drama
2 / 3 Grey Gardens: Best Actress – Miniseries or Television Film / Best Television Film
1 / 1 Dexter: Best Supporting Actor – Series, Miniseries, or Television Film
1 / 1 True Blood: Outstanding Television Ensemble
1 / 2 Damages: Best Actress – Drama Series
1 / 3 Little Dorrit: Best Miniseries
1 / 3 Into the Storm: Best Actor – Miniseries or Television Film

Losers:
0 / 4 Big Love
0 / 3 30 Rock, Mad Men, The No. 1 Ladies' Detective Agency
0 / 2 The Big Bang Theory, Castle, Diamonds, Endgame, Flight of the Conchords, The Good Wife, How I Met Your Mother, In Treatment, Loving Leah, The Prisoner, Taking Chance, Wallander, Weeds

References

External links
 International Press Academy website

Satellite Awards ceremonies
2009 film awards
2009 television awards